Pamela Weight is an English retired ice dancer. With partner Paul Thomas, she is the 1956 World champion and European champion. Weight retired from the sport immediately after the 1956 victories in order to marry and start a family.

Results
(with Paul Thomas)

References

 

English female ice dancers
Year of birth missing (living people)
Living people
World Figure Skating Championships medalists
European Figure Skating Championships medalists